Victory Gardens (1991) is the debut album from John & Mary, recorded in 1990 just six months after the two met in December 1989 and immediately following their signing with Rykodisc. John Lombardo, former member of 10,000 Maniacs and responsible for much of their early music, brought elements of the early Maniacs sound with him. Combined with the classically trained Mary Ramsey's blend of folk and classical influences, the album is considered by some to be heir to the 10,000 Maniacs album The Wishing Chair (1985), critically acclaimed for linking traditional influences with the contemporary new-wave sound.

Victory Gardens was produced by Lombardo and recorded at Mitch Easter's Chapel Hill Drive-In Studio in Winston-Salem, NC. The album features 10,000 Maniacs members Robert Buck and Jerome Augustyniak as well as special guests Ronnie Lane (Small Faces), Joey Molland (Badfinger) and Augie Meyers (Sir Douglas Quintet, Texas Tornados).

The song "Red Wooden Beads" was included on Steal This Disc Vol. 3, part of a series of compact discs released by Rykodisc in 1991. "Rags of Flowers" was included on Troubadours of Folk Vol. 5: Singer-Songwriters Of The '80s, part of a five volume series of compact discs released by Rhino Records in 1992.

Track listing
All tracks composed by John Lombardo and Mary Ramsey except where indicated
"Red Wooden Beads" – 2:53
"The Azalea Festival" – 4:28
"Piles of Dead Leaves" – 4:14
"We Have Nothing" (John Lombardo) - 3:47
"Rags of Flowers" – 3:20
"I Became Alone" – 3:33
"The Open Window" – 3:45
"July 6th" (John Lombardo) – 4:39
"Pram" (John Lombardo) – 3:21
"Un Canadien Errant" (Public Domain, arranged by Mary Ramsey) – 4:40

Personnel
John & Mary
 John Lombardo – 6 and 12 string guitar, bass, vocal, producer
 Mary Ramsey – vocal, viola, violin, piano, organ

Additional musicians
 Robert Buck – lead guitar, mandolin
 Jerome Augustyniak – drums, vocal (background - "We Have Nothing")
 Armand John Petri – percussion ("Un Canadien Errant"), engineer, mixing
 Ronnie Lane – vocal ("We Have Nothing")
 Joey Molland – vocal, guitar, guitar solo ("I Became Alone")
 Augie Meyers – accordion ("Un Canadien Errant")

Technical staff
 Stuart Sullivan – engineer
 Joe Barbaria – mixing
 Mitch Easter – engineer
 Toby Mountain – mastering
 Shannon Carr – mixing
 Dan Griffin – production

Singles 
In 1991 Rykodisc released a 7-inch vinyl promotional-only single
"Red Wooden Beads" – 2:53
"The Azalea Festival" (live version) – 3:10

References

John & Mary albums
1991 debut albums
Rykodisc albums